Sungaya is a monotypic genus of stick insects, containing the species Sungaya inexpectata. Its common name is the sunny stick insect, derived from the less commonly used sungay stick insect. The genus name refers to the locality of the holotype, i.e. the region where the insect was first collected. The species name is derived from the Latin as "inexpectatus" and means "unexpected".

Discovery and occurrence 
Oliver Zompro collected the first specimen of this species, a nymph, on 8 September 1995 near Mount Sungay in the province of Batangas-associated township Talisayon on the Philippine island of Luzon. She died a short time later due to a failed molting during transport. On October 7, 1995, he was almost at the same location where he collected an adult female. Zompro discovered more females in 1999 near the Taal Lake on ferns. The first males were discovered in 2008 by Orlando L. Eusebio, S. A. Yap and A. R. Larona, also on Luzon, more precisely at Mount Cayapo of the Mariveles Mountains in Baranggay Alangan in of the province of Bataan in the associated township Limay.

Features 
At the end of the abdomen they have a beaked secondary ovipositor, which surrounds the primary ovipositor. The nymphs and the freshly moulted imago of the stock known since 1995 are very light (beige). With increasing age, the adult females become darker and darker (light brown to black brown). The females of the sexual stocks found since 2008 are much more contrasting in color. Mostly dark brown to black tones dominate which are complemented by light brown areas and black or white bandages on the legs or body. Females are particularly noticeable with a white vertical line over their entire body. Females rarely appear in which green tones dominate the basic color. Unlike the white or black markings, this green color is not inherited, but rather caused by certain environmental influences. 

They are also light brown or medium brown and show on the meso- and metanotum an often indistinct, lengthwise line of different widths, which, depending on the basic color, can be dark brown (on a light background) or light brown (on a dark background) can. In the habitus they strongly resemble the males of the sister genus Trachyaretaon. Both sexes are wingless and on top with proportionate short and blunt spines, with a spine crown on the back of the head and the four spines on the meso- and metanotum particularly eye-catching. These are a bit more pointed in the males and often surrounded by a brown diamond pattern, especially in the light-colored females.

Reproduction 
The species reproduces both sexually and by parthenogenesis. Later generations laid their eggs individually into the damp earth. Meanwhile, females are known to leave their eggs just fall to the ground. While the nymphs of the original stock, as well as their fresh adult females, are very bright, the newly hatched nymphs of most of the sexually breeding stocks are often rather dark gray instead. Later, the female nymphs in particular show astonishing color variability. For example, animals are known whose basic color is dominated by green tones in the last stages before the imaginal molt. The entire development from first instar to adult takes about three to four months.

Sungaya spec. 'Lowland' was hybridized with an as yet undescribed Obrimini species from Negros, which at the time was called Trachyaretaon spec. 'Negros'. The two accidentally created females grew into adults, but turned out to be infertile and did not produce any eggs.

Taxonomy 
Zompro described the species and genus in 1996 based on the two specimens found in 1995. The adult female was declared as holotype of the species, the recently collected female nymph and two offspring of the holotype as paratypes. All four are deposited in his collection, which, according to him, is affiliated with the Zoological Museum of the Christian-Albrecht University of Kiel, although it is not available there. In a later publication, of which Zompro is the editor, it is announced that the holotype will be given to the Museum of Natural History of the University of the Philippines in Los Baños, where also the first two males collected by Eusebio, Yap and Larona are deposited. The genus name refers to the place where the holotype was found. The species name is derived from the Latin  "inexpectatus" and means "unexpected". In their genetic analysis based studies to clarify the phylogeny of the Heteropterygidae was shown by Sarah Bank et al that in addition to the species originally described, there as Sungaya inexpectata (Sungay "Highland"), there are two or three other species that have not yet been described. According to this, a breeding stock from Benguet would be regarded as a sister species to Sungaya inexpectata to be described. The males described by Ireneo L. Lit, Jr. and Eusebio 2008, in Bank et al as Sungaya sp. 2 (Limay "Lowland"), also belong to a different species. Its sister species, and thus probably also an independent species, is the last imported  Sungaya  sp. 'Ilanin Forest' from Morong, Bataan.

Terraristic 
The first of the adult wild-caught females captured by Zompro lay only four eggs before it died. From these three hatched nymphs, two of which grew into adult females. For years, the entire culture was produced asexually from these females. This first breeding stock is now referred to as "Highland", Sungay "Highland" or "Bantangas" and is only very rarely kept. The sexual stock, known since 2008, has since been imported several times and is known as "Lowland" or Limay "Lowland". The different stocks introduced as "Lowland" were crossed with one another before attention was paid to stocks of the same origin. Therefore, a new stock from the same region was brought into breeding, which was called Sungaya inexpectata 'Ilanin Forest' or better Sungaya sp. 'Ilanin Forest' and is genetically clearly different from the original 'Lowlands'. Another introduced stock called Sungaya inexpectata 'Benguet' or better Sungaya sp. 'Benguet' is kept and bred of pure origin.

They are most active at night. During the day they sit camouflage themselves on their food plants, which preferably have similar colors as the animals themselves. In addition to guava leaves (Psidium), the easily obtainable leaves of bramble, hazel, European beech, hornbeam, Norway maple, ivy, dogwood, ash, as well as numerous other leaves are eaten, making them suitable for terrarium keepers are very straightforward. Their food plant branches should be kept in narrow-necked vases in the terrarium and placed about every two days sprayed with water using a spray bottle. For oviposition, a good five inches high layer of damp humus-sand mixture should cover the ground. The eggs can be left in the ground or for better control can be transferred to a simple incubator.

The species that is one of the most frequently kept Phasmatodea species is listed by the Phasmid Study Group under PSG number 195.

Gallery

References 

Phasmatodea
Insects of the Philippines
Insects described in 1995
Monotypic insect genera